Force B was the name of several British Royal Navy task forces during the Second World War.

Mediterranean
Force B was first formed by the Mediterranean Fleet in July 1940. Comprising  the battleship  and five destroyers, it saw action at the Battle of Calabria under the command of Vice Admiral Andrew Cunningham.

In November 1940 it was involved in Operation MB8, a multi-faceted operation involving several forces with different but co-ordinated aims. The force sailed on 4 November with convoy AN 6 en route to Greece, departing that evening to Crete, then heading north to join Force C (the cruiser ) at Pireaus. From there the combined force under the command of Vice Admiral Henry Pridham-Wippell moved east into the Straits of Otranto to divert the Italian Fleet whilst the balance of the British forces attacked the port of Taranto in the  Battle of Taranto (Operation Judgement). Whilst in the straits, the cruisers intercepted an Italian convoy of four ships and destroyed three.

In March 1941, again under Pridham-Whippel, Ajax and the cruisers Orion,  and  formed Force B in an operation to bring the Italian fleet to battle, resulting in the Battle of Cape Matapan. In June Force B was re-formed to assist Allied forces in the Syria–Lebanon Campaign with Ajax, Phoebe and four destroyers. During this period ships of the force were engaged by Vichy submarine Caiman, which was damaged in a two-hour hunt and the destroyers Guepard and Valmy, which left the destroyer Janus badly damaged.

On 19 December, after taking part in conveying a supply ship into Malta in Operation MD 8 which had led to the First Battle of Sirte, Force B was deployed to find the Italian convoy encountered in that engagement but fell foul of a minefield off Tripoli, resulting in the loss of Neptune and Kandahar and damage to two other ships. After this, forces B and K were withdrawn from Malta.

Indian Ocean
With the outbreak of war in the Pacific and the advance of the Japanese on Malaya and the Dutch East Indies, British naval forces in the Far east were forced to retreat, first to Java, then to Trincomalee in Ceylon. In March 1942 Admiral James Somerville took command of a force of 29 warships, many approaching obsolescence. To remedy this deficiency he divided his ships into fast and slow divisions, Force A and Force B respectively. This force came under the command of Rear Admiral Algernon Willis.

This force came under attack during the Japanese Indian Ocean raid and on 9 April Hermes and Vampire were sunk by aircraft from the |Japanese carrier strike force Kido Butai. After this Force B was withdrawn to Kilindini, in British East Africa, where it was based until the RN could recoup its position in the theatre.

See also
 Force H
 Force K
 Force Z

Footnotes

References

 
 

Royal Navy task forces